Mohammadabad-e Pain Talarak (also Romanized as Moḩammadābād-e Pā’īn Talārak) is a village in Nazil Rural District, Nukabad District, Khash County, Sistan and Baluchestan Province, Iran. At the 2006 census, its population was 95, in 18 families.

References 

Populated places in Khash County